The Sandman is a 2017 American horror television film written and directed by Peter Sullivan and starring Haylie Duff and Tobin Bell. Stan Lee served as an executive producer of the film.

Plot

A little girl with formidable powers imagines into existence the Sandman, a terrible monster from her nightmares that brings harm to anyone who wants to hurt her.

Cast
Haylie Duff as Claire
Shaun Sipos as Wyatt
Shae Smolik as Madison
Tobin Bell as Valentine
Ricco Ross as Detective Price
Amanda Wyss as Dr. Amanda Elliott

Reception
Dread Central awarded the film two stars out of five.

References

External links
 
 

2017 horror films
American supernatural horror films
2017 films
2017 television films
American horror television films
2010s English-language films
2010s American films